Sharvand (also Romanized as Shārvand; also known as Sharband) is a village in Zalaqi-ye Sharqi Rural District, Besharat District, Aligudarz County, Lorestan Province, Iran. At the 2006 census, its population was 48, in 9 families.

References 

Towns and villages in Aligudarz County